Strongylosteus is an extinct genus of prehistoric ray-finned fish that lived during the early Toarcian age of the Early Jurassic epoch. Its type species is Strongylosteus hindenburgi (monotypy). It is related to modern sturgeon and paddlefish (Acipenseroidei), but with a different kind of mouth than common species, made for hunting prey in open waters, with a strong lower jaw, similar to modern beluga.

Strongylosteus has been suggested as a junior synonym of Chondrosteus, although there haven't been any new revisions about the status of the genus.

See also
 Prehistoric fish
 List of prehistoric bony fish

References

External links

Early Jurassic fish
Acipenseriformes